Armed and Dangerous is the first EP by American heavy metal band Anthrax, released in February 1985 through Megaforce Records. The band produced the album with Carl Canedy and Jon Zazula acting as executive producer. This is the first Anthrax release to feature Joey Belladonna on vocals, and the first Anthrax release to feature Frank Bello on bass guitar.

The 1992 issue includes the songs "Soldiers of Metal" and "Howling Furies" as its last two tracks. The line-up for those two tracks is Neil Turbin, Scott Ian, Dan Spitz, Greg D'Angelo (except where Charlie Benante rerecorded the drums), and Dan Lilker. It was released as a double album (along with Fistful of Metal) in (Germany) in 2000.

The song "Armed and Dangerous" also appears on the album Spreading the Disease with a different mix, which does not include the fade-in intro leading into the initial acoustic guitar melody. That intro was omitted from the album version for unverified reasons but it is possible that it was for album continuity.

The song "Raise Hell" was an original Anthrax recording exclusive to the EP, and "God Save the Queen" was originally recorded by the Sex Pistols on the Never Mind the Bollocks, Here's the Sex Pistols album. Despite being marked as live versions, "Metal Thrashing Mad" and "Panic" are studio re-recordings of tracks featured on the band's debut album.

Track listing

Personnel
Band members
Joey Belladonna – vocals
Dan Spitz – lead guitar
Scott Ian – rhythm guitar
Frank Bello – bass
Charlie Benante – drums

Additional musicians
Neil Turbin – vocals on "Soldiers of Metal" and "Howling Furies"
Dan Lilker – bass on "Soldiers of Metal" and "Howling Furies"
Greg D'Angelo – drums on "Howling Furies"

Production
Carl Canedy – producer
Alex Perialas – Norman Dunn – engineers
George Marino – mastering
Jon Zazula – executive producer

References

1985 debut EPs
Megaforce Records EPs
Anthrax (American band) EPs
Thrash metal EPs